Te Wairoa was a village, now a ghost town that is also known as the Buried Village, close to the shore of Lake Tarawera in New Zealand's North Island. It was a Māori and European settlement founded in 1848 by the Revd Seymour Mills Spencer where visitors would stay on their way to visit the Pink and White Terraces.  The village was destroyed by the eruption of the volcano Mount Tarawera on June 10, 1886. 120 people died in the eruption, many of them in other villages closer to the volcano. The site of one of these villages (Kokotaia) was instrumental in the recent rediscovery of the Pink and White Terrace locations.

A Māori meeting house named Hinemihi which provided shelter to the people of Te Wairoa village during the eruption was relocated in 1892 to Clandon Park as an ornamental garden building and a souvenir of William Onslow, 4th Earl of Onslow.

The Buried Village is open to the public and shows the excavated ruins of the village, recovered relics on display in a museum and the history of the eruption. It is located 14 kilometres southeast of Rotorua on Tarawera Road.

Wairere Falls 

Te Wairoa Stream flows on the southern edge of the village and over the Wairere Falls. The stream links Lake Rotokakahi with Lake Tarawera. Visitors to Te Wairoa may descend the falls via a trail with steps.

References

External links
 Buried Village - official site

Archaeological sites in New Zealand
Taupō Volcanic Zone
Buildings and structures in the Bay of Plenty Region
Former populated places in New Zealand
1886 eruption of Mount Tarawera
Museums in the Bay of Plenty Region
Archaeological museums
History museums in New Zealand
Natural disaster ghost towns
1840s architecture in New Zealand
Ghost towns in New Zealand